Adam Kyler Petty (July 10, 1980 – May 12, 2000) was an American professional stock car racing driver. He was the fourth generation from the Petty family to drive in races in the highest division of NASCAR racing, mostly in what was then known as the NASCAR Busch Series. He was believed to be the first young fourth-generation athlete in all of modern American professional sports.

Early life
Petty was raised in High Point, North Carolina into stock car racing "royalty."  The son of Kyle Petty, he was widely expected to become the next great Petty, following in the footsteps of his father, grandfather Richard, and great-grandfather Lee.

Racing career
Petty began his career in 1998, shortly after he turned 18, in the ARCA Re/Max Series. Like his father Kyle, he won his first ARCA race, driving the #45 Pontiac at Lowe's Motor Speedway.

Petty moved to NASCAR Busch Series full-time in 1999, driving the No. 45 Chevrolet. Petty finished sixth in his first Busch Series race at Daytona and had a best finish of fourth place at Fontana, though he also failed to qualify for three of the Busch races.  Petty finished the 1999 season 20th overall in points.

Petty Enterprises planned to have Petty run a second Busch season in 2000, while giving him seven starts in the 2000 NASCAR Winston Cup Series, in preparation for a full Winston Cup campaign in 2001.  He struggled early in the Busch season, but managed to qualify in his first attempt at Winston Cup during the DirecTV 500 at Texas Motor Speedway on April 2. He qualified 33rd and ran in the middle of the pack most of the day before his engine expired, forcing him to finish 40th. Adam never got to race alongside his father. Kyle failed to qualify and eventually relieved an ill Elliott Sadler, but Adam was already out of the race. Lee Petty, Adam's great-grandfather, and 3-time NASCAR Champion, lived to see his Winston debut, but died just three days later.

Death
On May 12, 2000, in a practice session for the Busch 200 race at New Hampshire Motor Speedway, which would have been his 48th career Busch Series start, Petty's throttle had stuck wide open going into the third turn of the track, causing the car to hit the outside wall virtually head on, killing Adam instantly as he developed a basilar skull fracture. He was only 19 years old.

Petty's death, along with 1998 Winston Cup Rookie of the Year Kenny Irwin Jr.'s in the same corner at the same track eight weeks later, led NASCAR to mandate the use of a kill switch on the steering wheel and the adoption of the Whelen Modified Tour restrictor plate for the September Cup race; which was abandoned following the race, in where Jeff Burton led all the laps to win. Both adjustments addressed the cause of the deadly accidents, with the exception of course of the basilar skull fractures suffered by both drivers. At Texas Motor Speedway, Truck Series driver Tony Roper died on October 14, 2000 of a similar skull fracture. Mandatory use of the HANS or Hutchens device (designed to prevent the rapid-deceleration head-and-neck movements associated with the injuries and skull fractures associated with the Petty, Irwin, Jr., and Roper deaths) was mandated by NASCAR in October 2001, following the later deaths of seven-time Winston Cup champion Dale Earnhardt on the last lap of the Daytona 500 on February 18, 2001 and ARCA RE/MAX Series competitor Blaise Alexander during ARCA EasyCare 100 at Charlotte Motor Speedway on October 4, 2001, both of which died from the same fatal skull injuries. NASCAR also adopted the SAFER barriers in 2002; drivers had requested installation of soft walls prior to the September New Hampshire Cup race.

Adam's father Kyle Petty, who had driven the No. 44 Hot Wheels-sponsored Pontiac Grand Prix Winston Cup car at the time of his son's fatal crash at New Hampshire, chose to take over Adam's No. 45 car in the Busch Series for the remainder of 2000, with Steve Grissom taking the wheel of the blue no. 44 Pontiac. He then used the No. 45 in the Cup Series throughout the rest of his driving career during most of the 2000s decade. Kyle Petty later admitted he struggled with a personal depression during the 2001 Cup Series season about the loss of his son, which partly resulted in his poor finish in the 2001 Cup standings, but inspiring him to keep on driving the 45 car paying his tributes to Adam.

Legacy

In October 2000, five months after Petty's death, his family partnered with Paul Newman and the Hole in the Wall Gang Camp to begin the Victory Junction Gang Camp in Randleman, North Carolina as a memorial to Petty. The camp has received support from many NASCAR drivers, teams, and sponsors, including Cup Series sponsor Sprint, which has placed a replica of Petty's 1998 car in the camp. The camp began operation in 2004 and is an official charity of NASCAR.

Petty also appears as a special guest driver in the video games NASCAR 2000, NASCAR Rumble, NASCAR 2001 and NASCAR Arcade. Both NASCAR 2001 and NASCAR Heat include tributes to both him and Irwin Jr.

In December 2013, Adam's brother Austin named his newborn son after Adam in tribute.

Motorsports career results

NASCAR
(key) (Bold – Pole position awarded by qualifying time. Italics – Pole position earned by points standings or practice time. * – Most laps led.)

Winston Cup Series

Busch Series

Craftsman Truck Series

ARCA Bondo/Mar-Hyde Series
(key) (Bold – Pole position awarded by qualifying time. Italics – Pole position earned by points standings or practice time. * – Most laps led.)

References

External links

1980 births
2000 deaths
American Speed Association drivers
ARCA Menards Series drivers
NASCAR drivers
Sportspeople from High Point, North Carolina
Petty family
Kyle Petty
Richard Petty
Racing drivers from North Carolina
Racing drivers who died while racing
Sports deaths in New Hampshire
Sportspeople from Trenton, New Jersey